Mani Nouri (born 1989 in Tehran, Iran) is an Iranian/Canadian actor and director. Since 2006, he has been working on modern visual projects. He was chosen the second best adolescent actor of the decade in the Middle East.

Career
He started his acting career with the television series Zizigooloo when he was six years old. Zizigooloo became very popular in Iran and Iranian culture. He then acted in movies such as Sweet Jam and Dear, I Am Not In Tune. He has won awards for his acting from Isfahan film festival and Iranian national TV channels. He has experiences in theatre with Davood Rashidi (The Third Richard). His directing career started in 2003-2004 when he directed a short movie called The Tree of Pain.

Television series

 1994: Tabeta Tales, as Zizigulu, the main protagonist. The show was directed by  Marzie Boroomand 
 1995: Jong 77, Directed by Mehran Modiri
 1996: Hotel, Directed by Marzie Boroomand
 1998: Gholamhosseinkhan, Directed by Marzie Boroomand 
 1999: Tehran 11, Directed by Marzie Boroomand 
 2000: La Maison, Directed by Masood Keramati
 2001: Nowrooz Stories, Directed by Marzie Boroomand and Masood Keramati 
 2002: Afagh Mother's House, Directed by Rasoul Najafian
 2002-3: Stars, Mani Nouri
 2003: The Magic Land, Directed by Siamak Shayeghi
 2007: Innocent, Mani Nouri
 2010-2011: Us, Mani Nouri
 2012: Yallan, Mani Nouri
 2013: Hate on sale, Directed by Khez 
 2014: The Last King, Directed by Hossein Soheilizadeh

Filmography
 1994: Escape from Life, directed by Basha Art Group 
 1999: Telephone, directed by Masoud Keramati
 2000: Sweet Jam, directed by Marzie Boroomand 
 2001:  (aka Dear, i am not in tune), directed by Mohammad Reza Honarmand
 2012: Wolves (banned Iranian movie)
 2013: Mad House, Mathilda Ghezelkhoo
 2014: City of Mice 2, Voice of Blacky, Marzieh Boroomand

Theater
 1999-2000: Richard III, directed by Davood Rashidi
 2008-2009: le monde de la rue (aka Street People)

Short movies and shows

 2000: Hasan Kachal
 2003: The Green Planet

Writer-director
 2002-2003: Saint-Paul et ses adultes
 2003: The Tree of Pain
 2004: W
 2005: La scène comme tell
 2008: Le Fil de Destin
 2008: Les Larmes noires
 2008: Safoora
 2008-2009: Les tristesses d'Iran
 2009: Momo : la victime d'immigration 
 2010: Arezoo
 2011-12: Une place sans ciel aka The Black Sky
 2013: I am Modern (Mockumentary)
 2015-2018: Abbas Abbas...Send Help! (long feature film) (Banned in Iran)
 2018: Feminin (long feature film'')

References

External links

 Jamejamonline.ir
 Sourehcinema.com
 Aftabnews.ir
 Cinemaema.com
 Aftab.ir
 Irib.ir
 Leila-hatami.com
 

1989 births
Living people
People from Tehran
Iranian child actors
Iranian male writers
Iranian screenwriters
Iranian film directors
Iranian male film actors
Iranian male television actors